Sundance (Lakota: Owíwaŋyaŋg Wačhí; "Sun-watching Dance") is a town in and the county seat of Crook County, Wyoming, United States. Its population was 1,032 at the 2020 census.  The town is named after the Sun Dance ceremony practiced by several American Indian tribes.

Demographics

2010 census
As of the census of 2010, 1,182 people, 532 households, and 326 families lived in the town. The racial makeup of the town was 97.8% White, 0.2% African American, 0.8% Native American, 0.4% from other races, and 0.8% from two or more races. Hispanics or Latinos of any race were 1.2% of the population.

Of the 532 households, 25.0% had children under 18 living with them, 51.5% were married couples living together, 8.3% had a female householder with no husband present, 1.5% had a male householder with no wife present, and 38.7% were not families. About 33.5% of all households were made up of individuals, and 16.6% had someone living alone who was 65 or older. The average household size was 2.16, and the average family size was 2.76.

The median age in the town was 47.5 years; 19.3% of residents were under  18; 6.1% were between 18 and 24; 19.5% were from 25 to 44; 31% were from 45 to 64; and 24% were 65 or older. The gender makeup of the town was 49.1% male and 50.9% female.

2000 census
As of the census of 2000, 1,161 people, 476 households, and 318 families resided in the town. The population density was 582.2 people per square mile (225.3/km2). The 545 housing units had an average density of 273.3 per square mile (105.7/km2). The racial makeup of the town was 96.64% White, 1.64% Native American, 0.17% Asian, 0.17% from other races, and 1.38% from two or more races. Hispanics or Latinos of any race were 0.60% of the population.

Of the 476 households, 27.7% had children under  18 living with them, 59.0% were married couples living together, 6.1% had a female householder with no husband present, and 33.0% were not families. About 29.4% of all households were made up of individuals, and 14.3% had someone living alone who was 65 or older. The average household size was 2.34, and the average family size was 2.91.

In the town, the age distribution was 24.1% under 18, 5.8% from 18 to 24, 24.7% from 25 to 44, 24.3% from 45 to 64, and 21.1% who were 65 or older. The median age was 42 years. For every 100 females, there were 95.1 males. For every 100 females 18 and over, there were 87.4 males.

The median income for a household in the town was $41,029, and for a family was $50,598. Males had a median income of $33,750 versus $21,000 for females. The per capita income for the town was $18,300. About 3.2% of families and 6.4% of the population were below the poverty line, including 4.8% of those under 18 and 13.5% of those 65 or over.

Geography

The town is directly south of the Bear Lodge Mountains, part of the Black Hills National Forest.

Skyline

Climate
Sundance experiences a humid continental climate (Köppen climate classification Dfb) with higher precipitation than the semiarid regions surrounding it due to its location in the Black Hills.

Education

Public education in the town of Sundance is provided by Crook County School District #1. Zoned campuses include Sundance Elementary School (kindergarten - grade 6), and Sundance Secondary School (grades 7–12).

Sundance has a public library, a branch of the Crook County Public Library system.

Area attractions
It was the first U.S. National Monument, established on September 24, 1906, by President Theodore Roosevelt. It receives about 400,000 visitors annually.

Highways
 
  - Alternate I-90 Business Loop (via Cleveland St. through central Sundance business district)

Media
Sundance is served by the Sundance Times newspaper, which reports on local news.

Sundance in popular culture

After his release from the town jail in 1888, Harry Longabaugh, an outlaw and member of Butch Cassidy's Wild Bunch in the American Old West, acquired the moniker "the Sundance Kid". His nickname entered the popular culture with release of the 1969 movie Butch Cassidy and the Sundance Kid, which won several Academy Awards, including Best Original Screenplay. Robert Redford, who portrayed Longabaugh in the movie, later named his Sundance Ski Resort near Provo, Utah, and the Sundance Film Festival after this character.

The town of Sundance is the primary setting of Scumble, a children's novel by Ingrid Law, and a sequel to her earlier children's book, Savvy. Sundance, Wyoming, is also the primary setting for Lorelei James' novels in her "Rough Riders" series of 16 books involving the fictional McKay family, eking out a living as multigenerational ranchers and the younger generation's accepting who they are individually, the ins and outs of working with family every day, and finding love.

See also

 List of municipalities in Wyoming

References

External links

 
 Sundance Chamber of Commerce
 Crook County School District

Towns in Wyoming
Towns in Crook County, Wyoming
County seats in Wyoming
Black Hills